In mathematics, specifically in functional analysis and order theory, an ordered topological vector space, also called an ordered TVS, is a topological vector space (TVS) X that has a partial order ≤ making it into an ordered vector space whose positive cone  is a closed subset of X. 
Ordered TVS have important applications in spectral theory.

Normal cone

If C is a cone in a TVS X (over the real or complex numbers), then the following are equivalent: 
 C is a normal cone.
 For every filter  in X, if  then .
 There exists a neighborhood base  in X such that  implies .

and if X is a vector space over the reals then also:
 There exists a neighborhood base at the origin consisting of convex, balanced, C-saturated sets.

If the topology on X is locally convex then the closure of a normal cone is a normal cone.

Properties

If C is a normal cone in X and B is a bounded subset of X then  is bounded; in particular, every interval  is bounded. 
If X is Hausdorff then every normal cone in X is a proper cone.

Properties

 Let X be an ordered vector space over the reals that is finite-dimensional. Then the order of X is Archimedean if and only if the positive cone of X is closed for the unique topology under which X is a Hausdorff TVS.
 Let X be an ordered vector space over the reals with positive cone C. Then the following are equivalent: 
 the order of X is regular.
 C is sequentially closed for some Hausdorff locally convex TVS topology on X and  distinguishes points in X
 the order of X is Archimedean and C is normal for some Hausdorff locally convex TVS topology on X.

See also

References

  
  

Functional analysis
Order theory
Topological vector spaces